This is a list of companies listed and traded on the Nairobi Securities Exchange. The original compilation of the list was done on 31 December 2015.

Agricultural

Automobiles and Accessories

Banking

Commercial and Services

Construction and Allied

Energy and Petroleum

Insurance

Investment

Investment Services

Manufacturing and Allied

Telecommunication and Technology

Growth Enterprise Market Segment

Real Estate Investment Trust

Fixed income security market segment
(FISMS)

References

External links
  Rea Vipingo Delisted from NSE

Nairobi Securities Exchange
Companies listed on the Nairobi Securities Exchange